Bethesda Hospital was a general-purpose hospital in the village of North Hornell, New York. It operated from approximately 1920–1970.

History

Bethesda's first facility was a frame building on Chambers Street. Having outgrown that facility, it built and moved into a much larger, single-story brick facility, located at 1 Bethesda Drive, about 1961. The hospital was unable to meet its loan payments and had to close. The former hospital is now Elderwood of Hornell, a proprietary (for profit) long-term care facility. After Bryant North Hornell Elementary School, it is the largest employer in North Hornell.

See also

 List of hospitals in New York (state)

References

Buildings and structures in Steuben County, New York
Defunct hospitals in New York (state)
Hornell, New York